SS Saros was a 2044-ton steamship which was wrecked at Point Hicks, in what is now Croajingolong National Park. Helmed by a Captain Aitken, it left Geelong bound for Sydney on 23 December 1937, but ran aground in heavy fog. All crew on board were rescued after a distress signal brought assistance from other ships.

Remnants from the wreckage are still visible to walkers in the area.

References

External links

1910 ships
Shipwrecks of Victoria (Australia)
Iron and steel steamships of Australia
Maritime incidents in 1937